Homage to King is a 1996 sculpture by Barcelona artist Xavier Medina Campeny, commissioned as a gift from the Spanish host city of the 1992 Summer Olympics to the host of the 1996 Summer Olympics. It is located at the southwest corner of Freedom Parkway and Boulevard in Atlanta, Georgia, in the Old Fourth Ward neighborhood. The work portrays Martin Luther King Jr. with outstretched arm, representing a welcome to those visiting the Martin Luther King Jr. National Historical Park. The location is also one of an oft-used view of the Downtown Atlanta skyline.

See also
 Civil rights movement in popular culture
 Memorials to Martin Luther King Jr.

References

External links
 

Landmarks in Atlanta
Outdoor sculptures in Georgia (U.S. state)
Statues in Atlanta
Steel sculptures in Georgia (U.S. state)
Old Fourth Ward
Memorials to Martin Luther King Jr.